Euphrosyne is a genus of flowering plants in the family Asteraceae.

Species
The following species are recognised in the genus Euphrosyne:
 Euphrosyne acerosa (Nutt.) Panero
 Euphrosyne dealbata (A.Gray) Panero
 Euphrosyne nevadensis (M.E.Jones) Panero
 Euphrosyne partheniifolia DC.

Species formerly included 
The following species are now placed in other genera:
 Euphrosyne ambrosiifolia A.Gray, syn of Hedosyne ambrosiifolia (A.Gray) Strother 
 Euphrosyne xanthiifolia (Fresen.) A.Gray, syn of Cyclachaena xanthiifolia (Nutt.) Fresen.

References

Heliantheae
Asteraceae genera
Endemic flora of Mexico